The Superior Courts Act, 2013 (Act No. 10 of 2013) is an act of the Parliament of South Africa that restructured the court system. It reorganised the various High Courts into a single High Court of South Africa, with a division situated in each province, including two new divisions to serve Limpopo and Mpumalanga. It rationalised and consolidated the laws governing the superior courts (the Constitutional Court, the Supreme Court of Appeal and the High Court), and altered the administration and financial management of the courts. The act was signed into law on 12 August 2013, and came into force on 23 August. It is associated with the Constitution Seventeenth Amendment Act of 2012, which makes corresponding necessary changes to the Constitution.

History
Transitional provisions in the 1996 Constitution require that the court system be rationalised to suit the new constitution "as soon as practical". The Superior Courts Bill was first introduced in 2003, but it was opposed by members of the judiciary and the legal profession, as well as by opposition politicians, because they claimed that it weakened the independence of the judiciary by putting the administration of the courts under the control of the Minister of Justice. The bill was ultimately allowed to lapse in 2009. In the meantime, the "Interim Rationalisation of Jurisdiction of High Courts Act" and the "Renaming of High Courts Act" were passed to allow the High Courts to be renamed and their areas of jurisdiction to be altered.

The Superior Courts Bill was reintroduced in 2010, but this new version made the Chief Justice, rather than the Minister of Justice, responsible for the administration of the courts, allaying the fears about judicial independence. The new version of the bill was supported by the official opposition Democratic Alliance. The bill did encounter substantial opposition from interested parties in Grahamstown, because it originally proposed that the main seat of the Eastern Cape Division should be moved to Bhisho; this change was ultimately reversed and the main seat will remain at Grahamstown.

The bill was passed by the National Assembly on 22 November 2012 and by the National Council of Provinces on 14 May 2013. It was signed into law by President Jacob Zuma on 12 August 2013, and brought into force by presidential proclamation on 23 August.

Provisions

The act restructured the High Courts into Divisions of a single High Court as described in the following table. In each division, if there was more than one existing court, one became the main seat with jurisdiction over the whole province, and the others became local seats with jurisdiction over a restricted area.

The Gauteng Division at Pretoria was to also serve as the Limpopo and Mpumalanga Divisions until the new courts are opened at Polokwane and Mbombela (Nelspruit). The Limpopo Division at Polokwane was opened on 25 January 2016, and the Mpumalanga Division at Mbombela was established on 13 May 2019.

References

External links
 Official text of the act

South African legislation
Courts of South Africa
2013 in South African law